Bebris Tsikhe is an early medieval fortress in Georgia in the historical region of Kartli, Mtskheta. It situated on the right bank of the river Aragvi, on the north of Mtskheta. In ancient time the fortress was called ″Belti″. Vakhushti Bagrationi calls it ″Beltistsikhe″. The fortress was built to protect Mtskheta and Tbilisi from the north, from the side of the Greater Caucasus Range.

The fortress naturally fits into the landscape, built to imitate a continuation of the mountain. The walls, over 2 m thick, are built with almost equal-size stones. The fortress has two levels: citadel and the lower courtyard. The citadel has a triangular shape. Three towers were erected at each corner of the triangle. The eastern tower originally had square shape, but it was destroyed and rebuilt in 18th century. The southwestern tower was the largest and also served as a donjon. It has four levels with embrasures, split by wooden ceilings. The walls of the lower courtyard are largely in ruins, but the fortress obviously had a multifaceted shape, following the complicated terrain. Its only tower was built from the east side to protect from the former road side. A part of the tower wall still remains. In the neighborhood of Bebris Tsikhe, archeological layers of ancient and feudal periods are identified. 

There is no written document about the origin of the fortess'es name. A legend about the Bebris Tsikhe says that once this territory belonged to a prince called Simon, who built the fortress in a narrow part of the ravine and put guards inside it. He had a pretty and kind daughter – Makrine, and a cruel and heartless son Mamuka.
After death of the father, Mamuka imposed an enormous tax on peasants. Who was not able to pay a tax was tortured cruelly by Mamuka. In vain begged kind Makrine her brother to mercy the peasants. The cruel brother didn't have a pity for her and imprisoned her in a tower.
Once, while peasants were making watery meal in a huge saucepan, unexpectedly two crows came over, flew into the saucepan and were boiled in it. The peasants pored the meal away. When Mamuka learned about it he got very angry and was about to whip them, but in this very moment, from the saucepan emerged snakes and twisted around him. Desperate Mamuka prayed God: ″Just save me and I’ll build a church in your name.″ Makrine watched her brother’s troubles from the window, who also prayed to God to save him. Merciful God accepted prayers and set Mamuka free from snakes. Saved Mamuka gave away his fortune, became a monk and began to collect donation for a church construction. His sister Makrina became a nun in Mtskheta.
Many years passed, Makrine died, on her funeral came a white-beard old man, gave a kiss to the deceased and said: ″My sister, we kept our promise″.  As soon as he pronounced those words he went on knees and gave his soul to the God. Since that the fortress is called ″Bebris Tsikhe″ (Fortress of an old man). 

The road was originally passing by the east side of the fortress, along the river bank. In the 19th century a new road was cut through the mountain, now passing by the west side of Bebristsikhe.

In 2004, Bebris Tsikhe was indicated as a National Cultural Monuments of Georgia.

References

Literature 
 Bebris tsikhe// Georgia:encyclopedia -Tbilisi.,1997. pg. 386
 Bebris tsikhe – Beltis tsikhe // description of Georgian historical and cultural monuments -Tbilisi., 1990, pg. 242
Закарая, П. (1983) Памятники Восточной Грузии. Искусство, Москва, 376 с. (In Russian)

Immovable Cultural Monuments of National Significance of Georgia